Laura Kieler (born 9 January 1849 in Tromsø, Norway – died 23 April 1932 in Ålsgårde, Denmark) was a Norwegian-Danish novelist. Events from her life and marriage served as the inspiration for the character Nora Helmer in Henrik Ibsen's play A Doll's House.

Biography 
She was born Laura Anna Sophie Müller to a Norwegian father, Morten Smith Petersen von Führen, and Danish mother, Anna Hansine Kjerulf Müller.

When Kieler was nineteen years old, she wrote a response to Henrik Ibsen's play Brand, Brand's Døtre, that endeared her to Ibsen and his wife. They became friends and nurtured her literary ambitions.

In 1873, she married Victor Kieler, a schoolteacher. The events of her marriage served as the inspiration for the character Nora Helmer in Henrik Ibsen's play A Doll's House. Kieler's husband contracted tuberculosis soon after their wedding, and like the character Nora, Laura Kieler borrowed money under false pretenses in order to finance a trip to Italy for a cure. Some years later, in a desperate attempt to repay the loan, Kieler forged a check. When Kieler's husband learned of the fraud, he demanded a divorce and sought to bar his wife from their children. Kieler had a nervous breakdown and entered a mental asylum for a month. They were later reconciled, but Kieler never forgave Ibsen for using her life as fodder for his controversial drama. 

Her later works occasionally continued to reference Ibsen, including her 1890 play Mænd af Ære which first played at the Casino Theater in Copenhagen. The play featured the plight of a woman who, in a fraught relationship, was exploited by her husband for writing material in a manner reminiscent of her own prior struggle. The intro to her book, Silhouetter, also features a personal account of her conflicted relationship with Ibsen. Later still, she withdrew from more personally-informed novels, and made a living writing historical and religious books.

Bibliography

References

1849 births
1932 deaths
Danish women novelists
19th-century Danish novelists
20th-century Danish novelists
Danish people of Norwegian descent
19th-century Danish women writers
19th-century Danish writers
20th-century Danish women writers
20th-century Danish writers
People from Tromsø